Human Age is the English language version of the free interactive  multiplayer browser-based French role playing game Human Epic.  The French version was launched in June 2005.  A German language version under the name Spiel das Leben was launched in January 2006.  The English language was launched the following month. It has been described as "The Sims meets Alter Ego".

Game play

Object
The object of the game is to evolve a character from prehistory through modern times by gaining skills, intelligence, stamina and knowledge applicable to the age. To accomplish these goals, a player takes on various trades and engages in quests.

Ages
The game is divided into ten ages:

 Age 1: Prehistory
 Age 2: The Celts
 Age 3: The Egyptians
 Age 4: The Greeks
 Age 5: The Kingdom Age
 Age 6: The Cowboy
 Age 7: Prohibition
 Age 8: The Hippies
 Age 9: The Twenty-first century
 Age 10: The Unknown

To date the game is released up to age 6 with age 7 currently under development, the release date is yet to be known.

Age One focuses on the prehistoric era of the human evolutionary cycle, where the player essentially learns how to function as a cave man or woman. The game has more of a single player focus with the function to private message other players. the aim is to gain strength, stamina and skill points as well as complete the designated quests. After completing a specific set of goals the player can progress to Age 2.

Age Two is a bit more in depth compared to age one; the concept of government and hierarchy is introduced. As well as completing quests and developing your character, the player can immerse themselves into the game on a deeper level. Players can now marry, gain reputation ranks and operate as healers, elect chiefs of the different tribes, engage in politics, peace and warfare. There are a variety of guilds to gain access to but players will either have to earn a place or be appointed. Guilds such as the robbers or Mercenaries guild will have to be earned through gaining higher ranks on player statistics boards. However, places in guilds such as the spies guild can be obtained if approved by the current clan chief.

Age Three essentially combines the same system as age 2. However, marriage, childbirth and raising children within marriage is introduced, as well as a more intricate system to the government. Officials and generals can be appointed within the game to involve more people than just the chief. This progression of facilities within the ages should reflect the development of the human during their evolution through time.

Age Four differs from the early ages in that it encourages players to log in several times per day. The character's energy recovers hour by hour, and they must build up experience points (XP) to progress to higher levels and gain access to new features of the game. Players can travel between the various Greek islands, trade resources between clans, and improve their dwellings.

Age Five is the Kingdom Age set during the medieval ages. Game play is very similar to the Greek Age with a few added quests and ways to get experience.

Age Six was released on August 1, 2011.

Due to behind the scenes conflicts maintenance ceased around 2013 (chat ceased working much earlier);  bugs multiplied, many tasks could not be completed, so evolution became impossible.  No one has heard from the remaining developer since April 2014, when he posted to the French forum that he was back at work on the game and all would be repaired.  Shortly afterwards Age 4 (Greek Age) disappeared and the domain name expired.  In October 2014 the game clock stopped for ages 1, 2, and 3 (they are on one server;  the other ages have individual servers). In early December 2018, the site was infected with malware via an iframe exploit. This is the status of the game as of December 2018.

The forums disappeared in 2019, about a year later the game was gone, the clocks never restarted.  A sad end to a wonderfully quirky little game, it deserved better.

References

External links
(All dead now, 2022)
 Human Age 
 Human Epic 
 Spiel das Leben 
 Wild West Age 

Browser games
Browser-based multiplayer online games
Free online games
Historical role-playing games
Role-playing game websites
Life simulation games
Role-playing games introduced in 2005
2005 video games
Video games developed in France